Ithaque (French for Ithaca) was one of three short-lived French departments of Greece.

History
It came into existence after Napoleon's conquest in 1797 of the Republic of Venice, when Venetian Greek possessions such as the Ionian islands fell to the French Directory. It included the islands of Ithaca, Cephalonia and Lefkada, as well as the cities of Preveza, Arta  and Vonitsa on the adjacent mainland. Its prefecture was at Argostoli on Cephalonia. The islands were lost to Russia in 1798 and the department was officially disbanded in 1802. Also Preveza, Arta and Vonitsa were captured in 1798 by Ali Pasha, ruler of the  Pashalik of Yanina.

During the renewed French control of the area in 1807–1809, the department was not re-established, the constitutional form of the Septinsular Republic being kept.

Administration

Commissioner
The Commissioner of the Directory was the highest state representative in the department.

See also
 Department of Mer-Égée
 Department of Corcyre
 French rule in the Ionian Islands (1797–1799)
 Treaty of Campo Formio

References 

 
 

Former departments of France in Greece
States and territories established in 1797
History of Cephalonia
Ithaca
Lefkada
1797 establishments in France
States and territories disestablished in 1798